AFC Mobile is an American soccer club based in Mobile, Alabama, that competes in the National Premier Soccer League. It formerly played in the Gulf Coast Premier League.

History

Founding
AFC Mobile was founded in 2015 by Mobile and Baldwin County, Alabama, soccer enthusiasts in order to establish a semi-professional soccer team in the City of Mobile. It was announced on January 3, 2017, that AFC Mobile would join the Gulf Coast Premier League for its inaugural Summer Season.  On November 12, 2019, it was announced that AFC Mobile would join the National Premier Soccer League in a newly formed Gulf Coast Conference that featured Mobile, Port City FC, Tallahassee SC, Pensacola FC, and NPSL mainstays the New Orleans Jesters and Jacksonville Armada.

Inaugural season
Prior to their debut season, AFC Mobile announced that it would play its inaugural season's home games at the Archbishop Lipscomb Athletic Complex, located in the Bolton neighborhood of Mobile. For its first two years, the team was managed by Nate Nicholas, a former player for the University of Mobile, former back-to-back state championship-winning coach at UMS-Wright Preparatory School, and current varsity men's coach at McGill–Toolen Catholic High School.

Changes to coaching staff
After finishing the 2018 GCPL season, head coach Nate Nicholas stepped down. 
 
Ultimately, Spring Hill College's men's soccer coach Steve Wieczorek was named as Nicholas's replacement on January 7, 2019.

Rivalries 
The club's main rival is Port City FC (formerly Biloxi City FC), who play in Gulfport, Mississippi. The clubs compete for the fan-based Forgotten Coast Cup, which started in 2017 when they were both in the GCPL.

Attendance 
For their debut game on May 14, 2017, AFC Mobile more than quadrupled the highest ever attendance for the Gulf Coast Premier League. In their second home game on June 10, 2017 against Biloxi City FC, AFC Mobile drew 924 to Archbishop Lipscomb Stadium, which topped the league's previous record. On June 8, 2017, AFC Mobile became the first team in the Gulf Coast Premier League to break 1,000 people in attendance against CD Motagua of New Orleans.

During their second season, AFC Mobile would go on to draw over 1,400 fans twice against the Gulf Coast Rangers and Port City FC.

Players and staff

2021 roster

Source:

Team management

Year-by-year

References

External links 
 Official website

Sports in Mobile, Alabama
2015 establishments in Alabama
Association football clubs established in 2015
Soccer clubs in Alabama